Osoyoos is the southernmost town in the Okanagan Valley in British Columbia between Penticton and Omak. The origin of the name Osoyoos was the word sw̓iw̓s (pronounced "soo-yoos") meaning "narrowing of the waters" in the local Okanagan language (Syilx'tsn). The "O-" prefix is not indigenous in origin and was attached by settler-promoters wanting to harmonize the name with other place names beginning with O in the Okanagan region (Oliver, Omak, Oroville, Okanogan). There is one local newspaper, the Osoyoos Times.

The town’s population of 5,556 (2021) swells in the summer months with seasonal visitors. Seniors (age 65 and over) comprise 43% of the town population. Another 2,139 people live around the town within Electoral Area A of the Regional District of Okanagan-Similkameen, and 1,426 more in the Osoyoos 1 Indian Reserve.

History

The first Europeans to Osoyoos were fur traders working for the Pacific Fur Company, an American enterprise.  They ventured up the Okanagan River to Osoyoos Lake and farther north.  After the Hudson’s Bay Company took over the fur trade in 1821, the Okanagan Valley became a major trade route for supplies to inland forts of British Columbia and furs that were shipped south to the Columbia River and the Pacific to European and Asian markets.  The final Hudson’s Bay Company brigade in 1860 was the end of an era, as gold rushes transformed the economy of the new Colony of British Columbia.  As parties of miners headed for the Fraser goldfields via the Okanagan Trail, they commonly met conflict with the Okanagan people. The Dewdney Trail passed through Osoyoos on its way from Hope to the Kootenays. The trail now forms the backbone of the Crowsnest Highway.

Thousands of miners heading to the goldfields and drovers with large herds of livestock crossed the 49th parallel after 1858.  A custom house was built in Osoyoos in 1861 with John Carmichael Haynes as the tax collector.  Haynes was also the first pioneer settler who obtained land along the Okanagan River north of Osoyoos that had been part of the Osoyoos Indian Reserve established by the Joint Indian Reserve Commission in 1877.  These lands, now known as the Haynes Lease lands, remain as an original house and barn.

Osoyoos was incorporated as a village in 1946 when the railway arrived and became a town in the 1980s. When the railway was discontinued, its station house was purchased from the Town of Osoyoos and moved 300 m north to its current location by the Osoyoos Sailing Club.

Geography
Osoyoos is situated on the east-west Crowsnest Highway (Highway 3) with a significant ascent out of the Okanagan Valley in either direction. The Crowsnest headed east begins with an  switchback up the flank of the Okanagan Highland with a  rise to the mining and ranching region of Anarchist Mountain, which is part of the Boundary Country (the stretch of rising highway is also referred to as Anarchist Mountain). Highway 3 westbound leads to Keremeos and the Similkameen Valley via Richter Pass. On Highway 97 south is a 24-hour border crossing between Canada and the United States between Osoyoos and Oroville, Washington.

The lake’s elevation marks the lowest point in Canada of the Okanagan Valley.

Ecology 
The far southern reaches of the Okanagan and Similkameen Valleys are part of a threatened xeric shrubland ecosystem in Canada known as the Columbia Plateau ecoregion. Specifically, the ecosystem of the area is named after the antelope brush plant typical of the local climate. This ecosystem was once more prevalent in the South Okanagan but is now becoming fragmented and degraded due to the spread of agriculture, urban development, and other human activities.

Since 2003, a feasibility study by Parks Canada has been going on to determine the need for protection of a large area of grasslands west of the town known as the South Okanagan-Lower Similkameen National Park Reserve Feasibility Study.

Climate

The climate, according to the Köppen climate classification, is a cold semi-arid (BSk) with summers that are generally hot and dry. Although it claims to be a desert, Osoyoos is actually about  too wet to be an actual desert.

September and October are usually dry and sunny with cool mornings. Winters are short and mild by Canadian standards, and usually dry, but can be cold for brief periods during Arctic outflow conditions bringing sporadic snowfall. Spring arrives earlier than other parts of the Okanagan. Osoyoos averages 7 months at or above .

During the summer, the southern Okanagan Valley is on average one of the hottest areas in Canada during the day, one of the few places in Canada where the average high is above . Temperatures exceed  on average 17 days per summer, sometimes topping . Although days are hot, the humidity is low and nights cool adequately. The summer mean is higher in Windsor in Ontario due to warmer nights where July averages . The USDA places Osoyoos in Plant Hardiness Zone 7a.

Average number of days:
above : 142.4
above : 36.0
above : 5.3

Agriculture

Although the fruit-growing possibilities were noticed by early settlers, the first commercial orchard in the area was not established until 1907, growing cherries, apricots, nectarines, peaches, plums, pears and apples. Osoyoos Orchard Limited was formed in 1920 and an irrigation project was planned which finally brought water to the west bench via “The Ditch” in 1927. The former shrub-steppe environment was transformed into a lush agricultural belt and Osoyoos promoted “the earliest fruit in Canada”.

Today, the area continues to produce tree fruits.  Aside from tourism, agriculture is a major component of the local economy, as is evident by the abundant produce stands along Highways 3 and 97, and the numerous commercial orchards surrounding the town.  With the growing popularity of viticulture, some of these orchards are being converted to vineyards, as the area is a major wine-producing region of Canada. After clearing of mainly sagebrush, parcels of bench land have been replanted for viticulture.

The vast majority of the land in the valley bottom surrounding the town is protected by the Agricultural Land Reserve which prevents valuable agricultural lands from being converted into other uses.

Tourism
 Tourism in the Osoyoos area has become a large contributor to the local economy.  This tourism is brought on by the many amenities in the Osoyoos area.

Osoyoos Lake is "the warmest freshwater lake in Canada" according to the town of Osoyoos and the BC Parks System, with reported average summer water temperatures of 24 °C (75 °F). The lake is surrounded by kilometres of beaches (public and private), parks and picnic grounds, such as Gyro Beach, Lions Centennial Park, Kinsmen Park, Legion Beach and Sẁiẁs Provincial Park. There are also major plans to revitalize the waterfront along the town core, spurred on by recent major developments such as the Watermark Beach Resort which include increased public space and an expanded marina.

Spotted Lake is a saline endorheic alkali lake located northwest of Osoyoos.

There are two centres dedicated to preserving the ecosystem of the Okanagan Desert.

The area is served by four championship golf courses - Osoyoos Golf Club which boasts two distinct eighteen-hole courses, the Park Meadows Golf Course and the Desert Gold Golf Course, Fairview Mountain Golf Club (Oliver) and the Nk’Mip Canyon Desert Golf Course (Oliver) - and one nine-hole course, Sonora Dunes (Osoyoos).

Demographics

The town's popularity among retirees is reflected in the age of the average resident at 55.4 years (2016) compared to 40.8 years for the rest of the population of British Columbia. The average age of the Osoyoos senior population is second in Canada only to Qualicum Beach, BC (60.1 years).

The town is served by a high school, Osoyoos Secondary School.

Ethnicity

Religion 
According to the 2021 census, religious groups in Osoyoos included:
Christianity (2,600 persons or 49.3%)
Irreligion (2,345 persons or 44.5%)
Sikhism (225 persons or 4.3%)
Hinduism (45 persons or 0.9%)
Buddhism (10 persons or 0.2%)
Islam (10 persons or 0.2%)
Other (15 persons or 0.3%)

Sports

Notable people
Chuck Kobasew - retired professional hockey player
Jack B. Newton - amateur astronomer
Alison Smith - television journalist and anchor

References

Notes

External links

Populated places in the South Okanagan
Towns in British Columbia
Populated places in the Boundary Country
British Columbia populated places on the Okanogan River
Populated places in the Okanagan Country